Joyce Vanderbeken (born ) is a Belgian female  cyclo-cross cyclist. She represented her nation in the women's elite event at the 2016 UCI Cyclo-cross World Championships  in Heusden-Zolder.

References

External links
 

1984 births
Living people
Cyclo-cross cyclists
Belgian female cyclists
Place of birth missing (living people)
Belgian cyclo-cross champions
Sportspeople from Kortrijk
Cyclists from West Flanders